In phonology, apocope is the loss (elision) of a word-final vowel. In a broader sense, it can refer to the loss of any final sound (including consonants) from a word.

Etymology
Apocope comes from the Greek  from  "cutting off", from  "away from" and  "to cut".

Historical sound change
In historical linguistics, apocope is often the loss of an unstressed vowel.

Loss of an unstressed vowel or vowel and nasal
 Latin  → Portuguese  (sea)
 Vulgar Latin  → Spanish  (bread)
 Vulgar Latin  → French  (wolf)
 Proto-Germanic  → Old, Middle, and Modern English land
 Old English  → Modern English love (noun)
 Old English  → Modern English love (verb)
 The loss of a final unstressed vowel is a feature of southern dialects of Māori in comparison to standard Māori, for example the term kainga (village) is rendered in southern Māori as kaik. A similar feature is seen in the dialects of Northern Italy.

Loss of other sounds
 Non-rhotic English accents, including British Received Pronunciation, suppress the final r in each syllable (except when it is followed by a vowel). (In most accents, the suppressed r lengthens or modifies the preceding vowel.)
 French pronunciation suppresses the final consonant of most words (but it is normally pronounced as a liaison at the beginning of the following word in the sentence if the latter word begins with a vowel or with an unaspirated 'h').
 Latin  → Spanish

Case marker
In Estonian and the Sami languages, apocopes explain the forms of grammatical cases. For example, a nominative is described as having apocope of the final vowel, but the genitive does not have it.

In Colloquial Finnish, the final vowel is sometimes omitted from case markers.

Grammatical rule
Some languages have apocopations that are internalized as mandatory forms. In Spanish and Italian, for example, some adjectives that come before the noun lose the final vowel or syllable if they precede a noun (mainly) in the masculine singular form. In Spanish, some adverbs and cardinal and ordinal numbers have apocopations as well.

 Adjectives
  ("big, great") →  →  (feminine) ("great woman". However, if the adjective follows the noun, the final syllable remains, but the meaning may also change: , meaning "large woman")
 Adverbs
  ("so much") →  ("so") →  ("so beautiful")
 Cardinal numbers
  ("one, a, an") →  →  ("a child")
  ("hundred") →  →  ("One hundred years of solitude")
 Ordinal numbers
  ("first") →  →  ("first prize")
  ("third") →  →  ("third place")
  ("final") →  →  ("final day")

See also
 Abbreviation
 Acronym and initialism
 Apheresis (linguistics)
 Clipping (morphology)
 Contraction (grammar)
 Elision
 Syncope (phonetics)

References

 Crowley, Terry. (1997) An Introduction to Historical Linguistics. 3rd edition. Oxford University Press.

External links

 World Wide Words: Apocope

Abbreviations
Figures of speech
Phonology